Acantholimnophila is a genus of crane fly in the family Limoniidae.

Species
A. bispina (Alexander, 1922)
A. maorica (Alexander, 1922)

References

Limoniidae
Tipuloidea genera